Kammerer is a German surname. Notable people with the surname include:

 Andreas Kammerer, German physicist and amateur astronomer
 Carl Kammerer (born 1937), American football player
 Charlene P. Kammerer, bishop of The United Methodist Church
 David Kammerer, Beat generation associate
 Doug Kammerer, Chief meteorologist at WRC-TV in Washington, D.C.
 Paul Kammerer (1880–1926), Austrian zoologist
 Zoltán Kammerer (born 1978), Hungarian sprint canoer

Fictional character:
 Maxim Kammerer, a fictional character from Strugatsky's Noon Universe

See also
 112233 Kammerer, an asteroid
 Cammerer (disambiguation)

German-language surnames